The 10th Legislative Assembly of Ontario was in session from May 29, 1902, until December 13, 1904, just prior to the 1905 general election. The majority party was the Ontario Liberal Party  led by George William Ross.

William Andrew Charlton served as speaker for the assembly.

Members elected to the Assembly
Italicized names indicate members returned by acclamation.

Timeline

External links
A History of Ontario : its resources and development., Alexander Fraser
Members in Parliament 10

References 

1902 establishments in Ontario
1904 disestablishments in Ontario
Terms of the Legislative Assembly of Ontario